Sparta is a neighborhood of the village of Ossining in Westchester County, New York, United States. Sparta borders the Hudson River, south of most of the village of Ossining. The neighborhood was a hamlet of the town of Ossining, and remains its oldest community. Sparta was founded by Dutch settlers in the 17th century. It has zip codes 10510 and 10562. The elevation is 56 feet.

The neighborhood includes the Sparta Historic District, the Jug Tavern, and the Sparta Cemetery. The New Croton Aqueduct, Old Croton Aqueduct, Old Croton Trailway State Park, and Trailways State Park Aqueduct transverse the neighborhood.

About a mile south of the village green is the Sparta Mine, a silver and lead mine that was worked prior to the Revolutionary War.

1 Rockledge Avenue is one of the oldest existing houses in Sparta, and was built circa 1784 by Philip Van Cortlandt, its first resident was Josiah Rhodes, a man who operated a mustard mill on Sparta Brook with William Kemeys. The property was alleged to be one of George Washington's headquarters during the Revolutionary War. Frank A. Vanderlip expanded and renovated the house in 1921 and added two new wings. He also bought about 70 nearby homes and business buildings. He tore down dilapidated structures, turned some to face the river, and moved at least one house to a new location.

Notes

Further reading
 
 

Ossining, New York
Populated places in Westchester County, New York
Hamlets in New York (state)